Coenia curvicauda is a species of shore fly in the family Ephydridae.

Distribution
Canada, United States, Europe.

References

Ephydridae
Insects described in 1830
Diptera of North America
Diptera of Europe
Taxa named by Johann Wilhelm Meigen